This is a list of 117 species in Triaspis, a genus of braconid wasps in the family Braconidae.

Triaspis species

 Triaspis abditiva Martin, 1956 c g
 Triaspis aequoris Martin, 1956 c g
 Triaspis affinis (Herrich-Schäffer, 1838) c
 Triaspis algirica Snoflak, 1953 c g
 Triaspis angustiventris de Saeger, 1948 c g
 Triaspis anomala Brues, 1939 c g
 Triaspis apionis (Rondani, 1872) c g
 Triaspis aquila Martin, 1956 c g
 Triaspis armeniaca Tobias, 1976 c g
 Triaspis azteca Martin, 1952 c g
 Triaspis bambusae de Saeger, 1948 c g
 Triaspis bangela Papp, 1984 c g
 Triaspis bictica (Papp, 1993) c g
 Triaspis breviventris (Thomson, 1892) c g
 Triaspis brucivora (Rondani, 1877) c g
 Triaspis buccula (Papp, 1984) c g
 Triaspis caledonica (Marshall, 1888) c g
 Triaspis carentica Lopez, 2004 c g
 Triaspis caucasica Abdinbekova, 1969 c g
 Triaspis caudata (Nees, 1816) c g
 Triaspis cervicalis (Cockerell, 1921) c g
 Triaspis claripennis Tobias, 1967 c g
 Triaspis collaris (Thomson, 1874) c g
 Triaspis complanellae (Hartig, 1847) c g
 Triaspis concava Chou & Hsu, 1996 c g
 Triaspis concisa (Fullaway, 1919) c g
 Triaspis conico Lopez, 2004 c g
 Triaspis convexa Belokobylskij, 1998 c g
 Triaspis corusca Papp, 1984 c g
 Triaspis curculiovorus Papp & Maeto, 1992 c g
 Triaspis daci (Szepligeti, 1911) c g
 Triaspis deversa (Papp, 1993) c g
 Triaspis devinensis Snoflak, 1953 c g
 Triaspis eflucta Papp, 1998 c g
 Triaspis elaeagni Tobias, 1986 c g
 Triaspis emarginata (Szepligeti, 1914) c
 Triaspis eugenii Wharton & Lopez-Martinez, 2000 c g
 Triaspis facialis (Ratzeburg, 1852) c g
 Triaspis fijica (Papp, 1993) c g
 Triaspis flavipalpis (Wesmael, 1835) c g
 Triaspis flavofacies Papp, 1999 c g
 Triaspis floricola (Wesmael, 1835) c g
 Triaspis fulgens Papp, 1971 c g
 Triaspis fumosa Papp, 1984 c g
 Triaspis glaberrima Snoflak, 1953 c g
 Triaspis graeca Papp, 2003 c g
 Triaspis halidayi Martin, 1956 c g
 Triaspis hansoni Lopez, 2004 c g
 Triaspis hispanica Papp, 1999 c g
 Triaspis imitatus Papp, 1993 g
 Triaspis krivolutskayae Belokobylskij, 1994 c g
 Triaspis kurtogaster Martin, 1956 c g
 Triaspis laticarinata Martin, 1956 c g
 Triaspis lugubris Snoflak, 1953 c g
 Triaspis luteipes (Thomson, 1874) c
 Triaspis magnafoveae Martin, 1956 c g
 Triaspis masoni Lopez, 2004 c g
 Triaspis matercula Martin, 1956 c g
 Triaspis mervarki Papp, 1999 c g
 Triaspis metacarpalis Tobias, 1986 c g
 Triaspis minuta Papp, 1971 c
 Triaspis nanchaensis Ma, Yang & Yao, 2002 c g
 Triaspis nishidai Papp, 1984 c g
 Triaspis nobilis de Saeger, 1948 c g
 Triaspis obscurella (Nees, 1816) c g
 Triaspis ocellulata Martin, 1956 c g
 Triaspis odontochila Martin, 1956 c g
 Triaspis odrina (Papp, 1993) c g
 Triaspis oranga (Papp, 1993) c g
 Triaspis pallipes (Nees, 1816) c g
 Triaspis pernegrus (Papp, 1993) c g
 Triaspis pinsapo (Papp, 1993) c g
 Triaspis pissodis Viereck, 1912 c g
 Triaspis podlussanyi Papp, 1998 c g
 Triaspis prima (Brethes, 1925) c g
 Triaspis prinops Papp, 1984 c g
 Triaspis pumila Papp, 1984 c g
 Triaspis pygmaea (Szepligeti, 1913) c
 Triaspis rectangulata Martin, 1956 c g
 Triaspis rimulosa (Thomson, 1892) c
 Triaspis ruficollis (Cameron, 1905) c
 Triaspis schrottkyi (Szépligeti, 1908) c g
 Triaspis scotospila Papp, 1984 c g
 Triaspis sculpturata (Szepligeti, 1898) g
 Triaspis sekerai Snoflak, 1953 c g
 Triaspis semiareola Papp, 1999 c g
 Triaspis semiglabra (Szepligeti, 1902) c g
 Triaspis semilissa Snoflak, 1953 c g
 Triaspis shangchia Chou & Hsu, 1996 c g
 Triaspis shawi Lopez, 2004 c g
 Triaspis similator (Szepligeti, 1901) g
 Triaspis simplicifrons (Brues, 1924) c g
 Triaspis stenochila Martin, 1956 c g
 Triaspis stenogaster Martin, 1956 c g
 Triaspis stictostiba Martin, 1956 c g
 Triaspis stilpnogaster Martin, 1956 c g
 Triaspis striatula (Nees, 1816) c g
 Triaspis striola (Thomson, 1874) c g
 Triaspis sulcata (Szépligeti, 1901) c g
 Triaspis tadorna Papp, 1984 c g
 Triaspis terebra (de Saeger, 1948) c g
 Triaspis testacea (Szepligeti, 1914) c g
 Triaspis thomsoni Fahringer, 1934 c g
 Triaspis thoracica (Curtis, 1860) c
 Triaspis transita Papp, 1984 c g
 Triaspis tricolorata Tobias & Saidov, 1997 c g
 Triaspis tripartita (Szepligeti, 1905) c
 Triaspis umbofer (Papp, 1993) c g
 Triaspis vernalis Belokobylskij, 1998 c g
 Triaspis versata Papp, 1984 c g
 Triaspis vestiticida Viereck, 1912 c g
 Triaspis virginiensis (Ashmead, 1889) c g
 Triaspis warnckei Papp, 1999 c g
 Triaspis whartoni Lopez, 2004 c g
 Triaspis wittei de Saeger, 1948 c g
 Triaspis xanthochila Martin, 1958 c g
 Triaspis xylophagi Fischer, 1966 c g

This is a list of 117 species in Triaspis, a genus of braconid wasps in the family Braconidae.
Data sources: i = ITIS, c = Catalogue of Life, g = GBIF, b = Bugguide.net

References

Triaspis